The president of the Government of Aragon, also known as the president of the General Deputation of Aragon or, simply, the president of Aragon, is the head of government of Aragon, an autonomous community in Spain. The President is elected to a four-year term by the Aragonese Corts.

Election
Under Article 48 of the regional Statute of Autonomy, investiture processes to elect the president of the Government of Aragon require of an absolute majority—more than half the votes cast—to be obtained in the first ballot. If unsuccessful, a new ballot will be held 24 hours later requiring only of a simple majority—more affirmative than negative votes—to succeed. If the proposed candidate is not elected, successive proposals are to be transacted under the same procedure within a 10-day timespan. In the event of the investiture process failing to elect a regional president within a two-month period from the first ballot, the Corts shall be automatically dissolved and a fresh election called. Before 2007, the Statute provided for these parliamentary deadlocks to be solved by deeming the candidate from the party with the highest number of seats to be automatically elected.

List of officeholders
Governments:

Timeline

Notes

References

 
Politicians from Aragon